Penny was a comic strip about a teenage girl by Harry Haenigsen which maintained its popularity for almost three decades. It was distributed by the New York Herald Tribune Syndicate from June 27, 1943, to October 25, 1970.

Publication history 
Penny began because Helen Rogers Reid, the wife of the New York Herald Tribune publisher Ogden Mills Reid, wanted to see a girl as the central character of a new comic strip.

Haenigsen had been doing a strip about a teenage boy, Our Bill (1939-1963), when he launched Penny as a Sunday strip on June 27, 1943. A daily strip debuted September 3, 1945.

The prolific cartoonist Bill Hoest was Haenigsen's assistant on Penny. After an injury from a 1965 traffic accident kept Haenigsen away from the drawing board, Hoest took over most of the work, although Haenigsen still supervised and signed each Penny strip.

In 1968, Hoest left to start his own strip, The Lockhorns, for the Chicago Tribune New York News Syndicate. Haenigsen chose to end Penny in 1970 and retired.

Characters and story 
Comics historian Don Markstein described the title character and her confused parents:

Reception 
In 1947, Nancy Blair of Lambertville, New Jersey was the winner in a Penny look-alike contest staged by the New Hope Recreation Center in New Hope, Pennsylvania.

In 1955, Vladimir Nabokov wrote the following description of Penny into his novel Lolita: "Her eyes would follow the adventures of her favorite strip characters; there was one well-drawn sloppy bobby-soxer with high cheekbones and angular gestures, that I was not above enjoying myself."

See also
Aggie Mack
Freckles and His Friends
Harold Teen
Teena
Zits

References

External links
The Cagle Post: Hogan's Alley

1943 comics debuts
1970 comics endings
American comics characters
American comic strips
Child characters in comics
Comics about women
Female characters in comics
Gag-a-day comics
Teen comedy comics